A kilonova (also called a macronova) is a transient astronomical event that occurs in a compact binary system when two neutron stars or a neutron star and a black hole merge. These mergers are thought to produce gamma-ray bursts and emit bright electromagnetic radiation, called "kilonovae", due to the radioactive decay of heavy r-process nuclei that are produced and ejected fairly isotropically during the merger process.
The measured high sphericity of the kilonova AT2017gfo at early epochs was deduced from the blackbody nature of its spectrum.

History

The existence of thermal transient events from neutron star mergers was first introduced by Li & Paczyński in 1998. The term kilonova was later introduced by Metzger et al. in 2010 to characterize the peak brightness, which they showed reaches 1000 times that of a classical nova.

The first candidate kilonova to be found was detected as a short gamma-ray burst, GRB 130603B, by instruments on board the Swift Gamma-Ray Burst Explorer and KONUS/WIND spacecraft and then observed using the Hubble Space Telescope  9 and 30 days after burst.

On October 16, 2017, the LIGO and Virgo collaborations announced the first simultaneous detections of gravitational waves (GW170817) and electromagnetic radiation (GRB 170817A and AT 2017gfo) and demonstrated that the source was a binary neutron star merger. This merger was followed by a short GRB (GRB 170817A) and a longer lasting transient visible for weeks in the optical and near-infrared electromagnetic spectrum (AT 2017gfo) located in a relatively nearby galaxy, NGC 4993. Observations of AT 2017gfo confirmed that it was the first secure case of a kilonova. Spectral modelling of AT2017gfo identified the r-process element Strontium which conclusively ties the formation of heavy elements to neutron-star mergers. Further modelling showed the ejected fireball of heavy elements was highly spherical in early epochs.

Theory
The inspiral and merging of two compact objects are a strong source of gravitational waves (GW). The basic model for thermal transients from neutron star mergers was introduced by Li-Xin Li and Bohdan Paczyński in 1998. In their work, they suggested that the radioactive ejecta from a neutron star merger is a source for powering thermal transient emission, later dubbed kilonova. Kilonovae are thought to be the predominant source of stable r-process elements in the Universe.

Observations

A first observational suggestion of a kilonova came in 2008 following the  gamma-ray burst GRB 080503, where a faint object appeared in optical light after one day and rapidly faded. However, other factors such as the lack of a galaxy and the detection of X-rays were not in agreement with the hypothesis of a kilonova. Another kilonova was suggested in 2013, in association with the short-duration gamma-ray burst GRB 130603B, where the faint infrared emission from the distant kilonova was detected using the Hubble Space Telescope. 
 
In October 2017, astronomers reported that observations of AT 2017gfo showed that it was the first secure case of a kilonova following a merger of two neutron stars.

In October 2018, astronomers reported that GRB 150101B, a gamma-ray burst event detected in 2015, may be analogous to the historic GW170817. The similarities between the two events, in terms of gamma ray, optical and x-ray emissions, as well as to the nature of the associated host galaxies, are considered "striking", and this remarkable resemblance suggests the two separate and independent events may both be the result of the merger of neutron stars, and both may be a hitherto-unknown class of kilonova transients. Kilonova events, therefore, may be more diverse and common in the universe than previously understood, according to the researchers. In retrospect, GRB 160821B is now believed to be another gamma-ray burst event followed by a kilonova, by its resemblance of its data to AT2017gfo.

A kilonova was found in the long duration gamma-ray burst GRB 211211A, discovered in December 2021 by Swift’s Burst Alert Telescope (BAT) and the Fermi Gamma-ray Burst Monitor (GBM). This discovery challenges the prevailing theory that long GRBs exclusively come from supernovae, the end-of-life explosions of massive stars.

See also
 Hypernova
 Nova
 R-process
 Supernova
 Supernova impostor

References

+
Astronomical events
Neutron stars
Novae
Star types
Stellar phenomena